Bernard Ireland was a British naval engineer, editor of Jane's and writer on naval matters.

Ireland was educated at the Royal Dockyard School, Portsmouth and at the University of Southampton. He worked for the Defence Research Agency, in ship research.

He wrote and coauthored 47 books l.https://www.goodreads.com/author/list/312760.Bernard_Irelandand contributed to journals and partworks on subjects related to ships and naval campaigns.

Ireland died on 8 February 2019 leaving a widow and two adult children.

Bibliography
Details given are not necessarily for the latest editions.

Naval Warfare in the Age of Sail Ted Smart, London, 2000. Jane's Battleships of the 20th Century (Jane's) HarperCollins, 1996Jane's War at Sea 1897-1997: 100 Years of Jane's Fighting Ships (with Eric Grove) HarperCollins, London, 1996War at Sea 1914-1945 Cassell, London, 2002Fall of Toulon: The Last Opportunity to Defeat the French Revolution Weidenfeld & Nicolson 2005Leyte Gulf 1944: The World's Greatest Sea Battle Osprey Publishing 2006Jane's Historic Military Aircraft Recognition Guide Harper reference, 1998History of Ships Hamlyn, 1999Jane's Naval History of WWII HarperCollins, 1998The War in the Mediterranean 1940-1943 Weidenfeld Military, 1993Collins Jane's Warships of World War II HarperCollins 1996Rise and Fall of the Aircraft Carrier Marshall Cavendish, 1979 Cruisers Hamlyn, 1981The Illustrated Guide to Aircraft Carriers of the World, A History Hermes House, 2005Battle of the Atlantic Pen & Sword 2003Warships Of The World, Submarines & Fast Attack Craft Ian Allan 1980Sea Power 2000 Arms and Armour, 1990Warships Of The World, Escort Vessels Ian Allan Ltd, 1979Vliegdekschepen Veltman, Utrecht, 2007The World Encyclopedia of Cruisers: An illustrated history of the cruisers of the world Lorenz Books, 2008Warships of the World - Major Classes Ian Allan, 1976Warships: From sail to the nuclear age Hamlyn, 1978Aircraft Carriers: An Illustrated History of Aircraft CarriersAircraft CarrierThe World Encyclopedia of Destroyers and Frigates: An illustrated history of destroyers and frigates, from torpedo boat destroyers, corvettes and escort to the modern ships of the missile age. Lorenz BooksAircraft Carriers of the World: An Illustrated A-Z Guide to Over 150 Ships 2007Warship Construction Ian Allan, 1987Navies Of The West 1984 Ian AllanVálka ve Středomoří : 1940-1943

References

External links
 Royal Dockyard School, Portsmouth
 Defence Research Agency

Year of birth missing (living people)
Living people
Alumni of the University of Southampton
British military writers